Abu Ghosh is an Arab-Israeli local council in Israel, located  west of Jerusalem on the Tel Aviv–Jerusalem highway. It is situated 610–720 meters above sea level. It takes its current name from the dominant clan inhabiting the town, while the older Arabic name used to be Qaryat al-'Inab.

History

Prehistory
Abu Ghosh is located in one of the earliest areas of human habitation in Israel. Archaeological excavations have revealed three Neolithic settlement phases, the middle phase is dated to the 7th millennium BCE.

Identification with biblical Kiriath-jearim
The old Arabic name of Abu Ghosh, Qaryat al-'Inab, has led to its identification with the biblical site of Kiryat Ye'arim (Hebrew meaning: "Village of Woods"), the town to which the Ark of the Covenant was taken after it had left Beth-shemesh. 
Edward Robinson was the first modern scholar to suggest that Qaryat al-'Inab was the biblical Kiriath-jearim. The team excavating the hilltop site of Deir al-'Azar, around the Monastery of Our Lady of the Covenant, lists a wide range of arguments in favour of identifying the site with Kiriath-jearim.

In the 19th century, C. R. Conder of the Palestine Exploration Fund (PEF) thought that the old site of Kiriath-jearim should be identified with Kh. Elsewhere, Conder and Kitchener, citing a "late tradition," noted that Abu Ghosh was, by some, thought to be Anathoth, the birthplace of the prophet Jeremiah, a tradition which has since been debunked.

Roman period

Legio X Fretensis of the Roman army had a station house in Abu Ghosh until the end of the 3rd century CE.

Early Muslim period
In 1047, Nasir Khusraw passed through the village while travelling from Ramla to Jerusalem. He noted: "By the wayside I noticed, in quantities, plants of rue (Sadab), which grows here of its own accord on these hills, and in the desert places. In the village of Kariat-al-'Anab there is a fine spring of sweet water gushing out from under a stone, and they have placed all around troughs, with small buildings contiguous (for the shelter of travellers)."

Crusader period
The Crusaders, who called the village Fontenoid, believed it was the site of Emmaus mentioned in the Gospel of Luke and built a church there. They later abandoned the identification in favour of Emmaus Nicopolis (see Emmaus#Historical identification).

Ottoman period

In the early Ottoman census of 16th century, it was noted as Inab, a village located in the nahiya of Quds.

There are several versions on the origins of the Abu Gosh clan: According to one version, Abu Ghosh is the name of an Arab family who settled at the location in the early 16th century. According to the Abu Gosh family tradition, they were of Circassian descent, and their founder fought with Selim I. In the 18th century, they lived in a village near Bayt Nuba, from which they ruled the surrounding region. However, according to the tradition, the Banu 'Amir tribesmen and the villagers of Beit Liqya rose against them and slaughtered the entire Abu Ghosh clan except for one woman and her baby, who continued the Abu Ghosh name. Some, however, assert that the Abu Gosh are indeed of North Caucasian traditional descent is correct, but the family is of Ingush origin and that "Abu Gosh" is in fact a corruption of "Abu Ingush".

The Abu Gosh family controlled the pilgrimage route from Jaffa to Jerusalem, and imposed tolls on all pilgrims passing through. They were given this privilege during the sultanate of Suleiman the Magnificent (1494–1566). The churches in Jerusalem also paid a tax to the Abu Ghosh clan. In 1834, during Egyptian rule in Palestine, the Egyptian governor Ibrahim Pasha abolished the Abu Ghosh's right to exact tolls from the pilgrimage route and imprisoned the clan's chief, Ibrahim Abu Ghosh, leading to the clan's temporary participation in the countrywide Peasants' Revolt. As a result, their village was attacked by Egyptian military forces.

In 1838, it was noted as a Muslim village, named Kuryet el'-Enab, located in the Beni Malik district.

It was attacked again in 1853 during a civil war between feudal families under Ahmad Abu Ghosh who ordered his nephew Mustafa to go to battle. A third attack on Abu Ghosh, carried out by the Ottoman military forces, helped and executed by British forces, took place during the military expedition against the feudal families in the 1860s. The Abu Ghoshes were among the well-known feudal families in Palestine. They governed 22 villages. The sheikh of Abu Ghosh lived in an impressive house described by pilgrims and tourists as a "true palace ... a castle ... a protective fortress ..."

An Ottoman village list of about 1870 showed that Abu Ghosh had 148 houses and a population of 579, though the population count included men only.

In the 19th century, the village was also referred to as Kuryet el' Enab.

In 1896 the population of Abu Ghosh was estimated to be about 1,200 persons.

At the beginning of the 20th century Qariat el-'Inab functioned as a 'throne village', or local seat of power.

Kiryat Anavim, the first kibbutz in the Judean Hills, was founded near Abu Ghosh in 1914, on land purchased from the Abu Ghosh family.

British Mandate

In the 1922 census of Palestine conducted by the British Mandate authorities, Enab had a population 475, 450 Muslims and 25 Christians, increasing in the 1931 census to 601; 576 Muslims and 25 Christians, in 138 houses.

When Chaim Weizmann, later the first president of the State of Israel, visited Palestine in the spring of 1920, he was hosted by the residents of Abu Ghosh. From the early 20th century, the leaders of Abu Ghosh worked together and were on friendly terms with the Zionist leaders, and local Jews.

In the 1945 Village Statistics the population of Qaryat el 'Inab (Abu Ghosh) was 860; 820 Muslims and 40 Christians, with a total of 7,590 dunams of land according to an official land and population survey. Of this, a total of 1,517 dunams were plantations and irrigable land, 3,274 for cereals, while 21 dunams were built-up (urban) land.

During the 1947–48 Civil War in Mandatory Palestine and into the 1948 Arab-Israeli War, the road to Jerusalem was blocked for Jews, as passage through the hills surrounding Jerusalem was crucial for getting supplies to the Jewish parts of the besieged city. Of the 36 Arab Muslim villages in these hills, Abu Ghosh was the only one that remained neutral, and in many cases helped to keep the road open for Jewish convoys. "From here it is possible to open and close the gates to Jerusalem," said former President Yitzhak Navon. Many in Abu Ghosh helped Israel with supplies.

During Operation Nachshon the Haganah reconsidered an attack on Abu Ghosh due to opposition of the Lehi, whose local commanders were on good terms with the mukhtar (village chief).

Israel

1948 war

During the 1948 Arab–Israeli War, the Har'el Brigade headquarters were located in Abu-Ghosh. Many of the villagers left Abu Ghosh during the heavy fighting in 1948, but most returned home in the following months.

The Israeli government, subsequently on peaceful terms with the village, invested in improving the infrastructure of the village.

Abu Ghosh mayor Salim Jaber attributed in 2007 the good relations with Israel to the great importance attached to being hospitable: "We welcome anybody, regardless of religion or race." According to a village elder interviewed by The Globe and Mail: "Perhaps because of the history of feuding with the Arabs around us we allied ourselves with the Jews ... against the British. We did not join the Arabs from the other villages bombarding Jewish vehicles in 1947. The Palmach fought many villages around us. But there was an order to leave us alone. The other Arabs never thought there would be a Jewish government here. ... During the first truce of the War of Independence, I was on my way to Ramallah to see my father and uncles, and I was captured by Jordanian soldiers. They accused me of being a traitor and tortured me for six days."

Martial law (1949–1966)

During the early years of the State of Israel the village was subjected to repeated searches by the army and anyone who had not registered as resident in November 1948 could be expelled. One case attracted a lot of public criticism. In June 1950, the IDF and police deported 105 men and women believed to be "infiltrators" to Jordan. In an open letter to the Knesset, the inhabitants of Abu Ghosh claimed that the army had "surrounded our village, and taken our women, children and old folk, and thrown them over the border and into the Negev Desert, and many of them died in consequence, when they were shot [trying to make their way back across] the borders." The letter further stated that they woke up to "shouts blaring over the loudspeaker announcing that the village was surrounded and anyone trying to get out would be shot. ... The police and military forces then began to enter the houses and conduct meticulous searches, but no contraband was found. In the end, using force and blows, they gathered up our women, and old folk and children, the sick and the blind and pregnant women. These shouted for help but there was no saviour. And we looked on and were powerless to do anything save beg for mercy. Alas, our pleas were of no avail... They then took the prisoners, who were weeping and screaming, to an unknown place, and we still do not know what befell them."

Knesset member Moshe Erem accused the army of excessive force, a charge that Prime Minister Ben-Gurion denied. He also defended the policy of expulsions. Foreign Minister Moshe Sharett, concerned about international reaction, argued that there should be more searches with fewer people being deported at one time and then only adult males. One of the issues causing concern in this case was that some of those expelled had been resident in Abu Ghosh for over a year. In the wake of public pressure, the vast majority of villagers were allowed to return. In July 1952, MK Beba Idelson objected to the deportation of an Abu Ghosh woman, who was said to have cancer, and her four children. The police minister Bechor-Shalom Sheetrit rejected the claim that the woman had cancer. The village remained under martial law until 1966.

21st century
In 2017, Abu Ghosh was described as a "model of coexistence."

Archaeology
In 2017 an archaeological dig began at Deir el-'Azar, the site of the convent, led by Israel Finkelstein of Tel Aviv University and Christophe Nicolle and Thomas Römer of the College de France. The first season brought to light a huge, 110 by 150 metres stone platform or podium at the top of the hill, with retaining walls 3 m thick, 6 to 7 metres high and perfectly aligned north–south and east–west, which were dated to the first half of the eighth century BCE during the Iron IIB period (900–700 BCE). Finkelstein attributed the ancient structure to King Jeroboam II of the northern Kingdom of Israel, seeing in it a sign of its dominance over the southern Kingdom of Judah and its capital, Jerusalem. He speculated that the platform might have housed an administration compound that included a temple of the Ark, with the aim of enforcing the domination of Israel over Judah.

The hilltop shows signs of intensive settlement activity during the Iron IIC period (700–586 BCE), when the rectangular podium at the summit was reconstructed. Renewed reconstruction of the podium took place in the late Hellenistic period, possibly as part of the fortification works undertaken by the Seleucid general Bacchides. In the first century CE it seems that the flat hilltop was used as a Roman camp by the Xth Roman legion, Fretensis, for which reason the Romans extended the platform to create a perfectly square, 150 by 150 metres base for their fortified camp. From the Byzantine period remains of a basilica were discovered, possibly dating to the 5th century. The Arabic name Deir el-ʿAzar, lit. "Monastery of el-ʿAzar" may be a corruption of Eleazar, leading to the theory that it was named after the high priest who was charge of the Ark while it was at Kiriath-jearim. This monastery seems to have functioned to the end of the Byzantine and maybe into the beginning of the Early Islamic period, since very few pottery sherds were found from a later period.

Local government
Abu Ghosh is governed by a local council, and is part of the Jerusalem District. The current mayor of Abu Ghosh is Salim Jaber.

Religious sites

Benedictine St Mary of the Resurrection Abbey
The Crusader church at the historical entrance to the village, now at the centre of the Benedictine Monastery, is one of the best preserved Crusader remains in the country. The Hospitallers had built this late Romanesque/early Gothic church in 1140 and it was partially destroyed in 1187. It was acquired by the French government in 1899 and placed under guardianship of the French Benedictine Fathers. Since 1956, it has been run by the Lazarist Fathers. Today a double community of nuns and brothers continue the worship in the church and offer hospitality, reflecting the ancient story of the couple on the Jerusalem–Emmaus road. Edward Robinson (1838) described it as "obviously from the time of the crusades, and [...] more perfectly preserved than any other ancient church in Palestine." Excavations carried out in 1944 confirm that the Crusaders identified the site as the biblical Emmaus. The church is now known as both Church of the Resurrection and Emmaus of the Crusaders.

Church of Notre Dame
The Church of Notre Dame de l'Arche d'Alliance (Our Lady of the Ark of the Covenant Church), built in 1924, is said to occupy the site of the house of Abinadab, where the Ark of the Covenant rested for twenty years until King David took it to Jerusalem. It is built on the site of a fifth-century Byzantine church, from which a 5th-century mosaic floor was preserved. The church is recognizable by the roof-top statue of Mary carrying the infant Jesus in her arms.

Abu Ghosh mosques
Abu Ghosh's historic mosque is in the town center. The new Akhmad Kadyrov Mosque, completed in 2014, is the largest mosque in Israel and was built with money donated by the Chechen government.

Music and culture

The Abu Gosh Music Festival is held twice a year, in the fall and late spring, with musical ensembles and choirs from Israel and abroad performing in and around the churches in Abu Ghosh. The monks believe that holding concerts on the grounds of their churches is a "fine symbol of friendship and welcome. Jews coming to a Muslim community to hear music in a Christian church...is a small, white pebble in the path that we want."

Local cuisine
Abu Ghosh is popular among Palestinians and Israelis for its Middle Eastern restaurants and hummus.

In 2007, Abu Ghosh was described as the "hummus capital of Israel." In January 2010, Abu Ghosh secured the Guinness World Record for preparing the largest dish of hummus in the world. Jawdat Ibrahim, owner of Abu Ghosh hummus restaurant, organized the event, which brought together 50 Jewish and Israeli-Arab chefs. The winning  dish weighed 4,087.5 kilograms (8992.5 pounds), about twice as much as the previous record set by Lebanon in October 2009. In May 2010, Lebanon regained the Guinness World Record, more than doubling Abu Ghosh's January 2010 total.

Chametz ceremony
Since 1997, Jaaber Hussein, a Muslim Arab-Israeli hotel food manager from Abu Ghosh, has signed an agreement with Israel's Chief Rabbis to purchase all of the state's chametz, the leavened products not kosher for the Jewish holiday of Passover. This contractually binding deal allows the state to respect religious edicts without wastefully destroying massive quantities of food. In 2009, Hussein put down a cash deposit of $4,800 (about 20,000 shekels) for $150 million worth of chametz, acquired from state companies, the prison service and the national stock of emergency supplies. At the end of Passover each year, the deposit is returned to Hussein and the State of Israel buys back all the food products.

Gallery

See also
 Arab localities in Israel
 List of modern names for biblical place names

References

Bibliography

 
  (pp. 18, 43, 132–133)
 
 
 
 
 
 
 
 
  (p. 321)
  p. 335

External links

 Welcome To Qaryet al-'Inab/Abu Goush
 Survey of Western Palestine, Map 17: IAA, Wikimedia commons

 
Local councils in Jerusalem District
Arab localities in Israel
Tegart forts
Throne villages
Canaanite cities
Hummus
16th-century establishments in Ottoman Syria
Ingush diaspora